Vanina is a feminine given name. Notable people with the name include:
Vanina Correa (born 1983), Argentine footballer
Vanina García Sokol (born 1983), Argentine tennis player
Vanina Ickx (born 1975), Belgian race car driver
Vanina Oneto (born 1973), Argentine field hockey player
Vanina Paoletti (born 1997), French canoeist
Vanina Ruhlmann-Kleider (born 1961), French physicist
Vanina Sánchez (born 1979), Argentine taekwondo competitor

Fictional characters with the name include:
Vanina, the main character of 1922 German silent film Vanina
Vanina Vanini, the main character of 1829 Stendahl short story Vanina Vanini

See also
Eugenia Vanina, Russian indologist
Vanina, Kursk Oblast, village in Russia